Aral, also known as Aralsk or Aral'sk, (Kazakh: Арал, Aral, ارال; Russian: Аральск, Araljsk)  is a small city in south-western Kazakhstan, located in the oblast (region) of Kyzylorda. It serves as the administrative center of Aral District. Aral was formerly a fishing port and harbour city on the banks of the Aral Sea, and was a major supplier of fish to the neighboring region. Population:

History

Early settlement

In 1817, there was a village Alty-Kuduk (Six Wells) near the present city of Aralsk. This is currently a railway passing-track in the southern part of the city. Since the 1870s, this was recorded as the Aralsky settlement. The development of Aralsk began when the Orenburg-Tashkent railway was being constructed (1899-1905). In 1905, the railway station was constructed and continues to operate. The official history of Aralsk began that same year.

In 1905, Russian merchants organized large fishing companies and formed a joint-stock firm in Aralsk. This was the beginning of fishery in the Aral Sea and shipbuilding plants soon followed in Aralsk.

After the Revolution, the station “Aralskoye more (sea)” with the adjoining settlement received the name Aralsk. In 1938, Aralsk and the Aralsky district became a part of newly formed Kzyl-Orda oblast of Kazakh SSR and turned into the town.

Aralsk is not to be confused with Fort Aralsk which was about 120 km south.  In 1847 Russia built Raimsk, later called Fort Aralsk, near the mouth of the Syr Darya. In either 1848 or 1853 or 1855 Raimsk was abandoned and Fort Aralsk moved upriver to Fort Number One, or Kazalinsk. Further upriver were forts No. 2 and 3 which were the old Kokandi forts of Karmaktschy and Kumish-Kurgan.  Fort Aralsk was used to launch ships to map the Aral Sea and as a base to attack Ak Mechet.

Decline
Since the retreat of the Aral Sea since 1960, due to diversion of the rivers flowing into it for irrigation, mainly of cotton, during the Soviet era, Aral is now completely landlocked about 12 km from the northern remnant of the Aral Sea, though this is less than the 100 km distance observed before the completion of a dam in 2005. Aral has greatly diminished in population and socioeconomic significance, resulting in high levels of unemployment. For the last 25 years it has not been possible to see the sea from the town. There are also serious health problems for the local population caused by airborne toxic chemicals exposed to the wind by the retreating waters and, possibly, from chemical and biological agents unsafely stored on the island of Vozrozhdeniya.

Aral smallpox incident

In 1971, a massive public health response to a smallpox outbreak in Aral ensued once the disease was recognized as resulting from the release of weaponized smallpox from a nearby biological weapons test site. In less than 2 weeks, approximately 50,000 residents of Aral were vaccinated. Household quarantine of potentially exposed individuals was enacted, and hundreds were isolated in a makeshift facility at the edge of the city. All traffic in and out of the city was stopped, and approximately 54,000 square feet of living space and 18 metric tons of household goods were decontaminated by health officials. The original outbreak sickened ten people in Aral, of whom 3 died.

Climate
Aral has a cold desert climate (Köppen climate classification BWk) with cold winters and hot summers.

References

Further reading

External links

 News story on the plight of Aralsk and the Aral Sea. 
 The shrinking Aral Sea. 
 Bringing life back to Asia's 'dead' sea. 

Populated places in Kyzylorda Region